Nanchang Institute of Technology (abbr. NIT) is a national public and high-level applied engineering university in Nanchang, China. The university is established and funded by the People's Government of Jiangxi Province., Ministry of Water Resources, and Ministry of Education.

Nanchang Institute of Technology (NIT) is a university with high reputation in the region. By 2023, it ranked 733rd among Asia universities by Edurank.  In terms of three majors: water conservancy and hydropower engineering, hydrology and water resources engineering, and soil and water conservation and desertification control, it ranked 1st in the country by Chinese university ranking (CUAA). 

The sister schools on the list are: Tsinghua University, Beijing University, Wuhan University, Hohai University, North China University of Water Resources and Electric Power, Beijing Forestry University, Nanjing Forestry University, China Agricultural University. In addition, partnerships have been established with several universities in Australia, the US, the UK, the Netherlands and Korea.

History 
It was established and known as Jiangxi Institute of Water Conservancy and Electric Power in 1958. It became Nanchang Institute of Technology in 2004 and was awarded as a pilot university for the "Excellent Engineer Education and Training Program" in 2011. It was also approved as a direct training institution for non-commissioned officers in 2013 and became a "first-class discipline" construction university in 2017. In 2018, it was selected as a national first-class professional construction university. As a significant step in the innovation and reformation aspect of the university, Yaohu Honors College was established in 2014 with the aim of further selecting undergraduate students with passionate research interest and high versatility from the university (40 out of over 4000 students). While studying in the honours college, students are fully exposed to interdisciplinary exploration, intensive research training and international exchange.

Academics

Education 
The university is dedicated to building world-class academic programs and capitalizing on the strategic opportunity of "Double First-Class". Currently there are 13 departments:

 Yaohu Honors College 

 Department of Water Conservancy and Ecological Engineering
 Department of Civil and Architectural Engineering
 Department of Mechanical Engineering
 Department of Electrical Engineering
 Department of Information Engineering
 Department of Business Administration
 Department of Economics and Trade
 Department of Humanities and Arts
 Department of Science
 Department of Foreign Language
 Department of Non-commissioned Officer
 Department of Physical Education Department

Yaohu Honors College  
Every year, Yaohu Honors College selects 40 exceptional students from science and engineering majors, who demonstrate academic excellence, and a keen interest in scientific research. Admission to Yaohu Honors College is rather competitive and eligible candidates must achieve excellent scores in university entrance examination (around top 10% in the province). Enrolled students in Yaohu Honors College are fully exposed to research training, interest-oriented studying and international exchange. The studying can be rather stressful and challenging when enrolled students will be comprehensively evaluated and ranked in terms of course scores, research and innovation achievement, discipline competition and etc. at the end of every semester.

Department of Water Conservancy and Ecological Engineering 
The department has a very strong focus on water engineering safety, efficient utilization of resources, and ecological conservation, with national-level platforms for research and development, such as the Poyang Lake Basin platform, joint engineering laboratory, and several provincial-level key laboratories and engineering research centers. Additionally, the college has established a variety of school-level research institutions and experimental centers, including the Poyang Lake Research Institute, Water Conservancy Engineering Research Center, and multiple off-campus practice training bases.

Department of Civil and Architectural Engineering 
The department offers six undergraduate majors, including civil engineering with specializations in construction engineering and underground space, urban and rural planning, water supply and drainage science and engineering, engineering cost, road bridge and river crossing engineering, and architecture. The civil engineering major is a first-class characteristic major in Jiangxi Province, and is part of the Jiangxi Provincial Excellent Engineer Education and Training Program. The college has two provincial scientific research platforms, namely the "Jiangxi Water Conservancy and Civil Engineering Infrastructure Safety Key Laboratory" and the "Jiangxi Water Conservancy and Civil Engineering Special Reinforcement and Safety Monitoring Engineering Research Center." It is also home to the provincial key discipline of "Twelfth Five-Year" plan. In terms of research facilities, the college has geotechnical engineering laboratories, building materials laboratories, construction engineering training bases, computing and drawing computer rooms, road and bridge engineering laboratories, structural engineering laboratories, water supply and drainage experiment centers, project cost laboratories, and a BIM engineering center.

References

Universities in China